The 2022–23 UEFA Europa Conference League group stage began on 8 September 2022 and ended on 3 November 2022. A total of 32 teams competed in the group stage to decide 8 of the 16 places in the knockout phase of the 2022–23 UEFA Europa Conference League.

All teams besides AZ, Basel, CFR Cluj, Gent, Partizan, Slavia Prague and Slovan Bratislava, who competed in last season's group stage, made their debut appearances in the group stage. Ballkani, Djurgårdens IF, Dnipro-1, Pyunik, RFS, Silkeborg, Slovácko, Vaduz and Žalgiris made their debut appearances in a UEFA competition group stage. Ballkani, Vaduz and Žalgiris were the first teams from Kosovo, Liechtenstein and Lithuania, respectively, to play in a UEFA competition group stage.

A total of 28 national associations were represented in the group stage.

Draw 
The draw for the group stage was held on 26 August 2022 in Istanbul, Turkey. The 32 teams were drawn into eight groups of four. For the draw, the teams were seeded into four pots, each of eight teams, based on their 2022 UEFA club coefficients. Teams from the same association and, for political reasons, teams from Serbia and Kosovo could not be drawn into the same group. Prior to the draw, UEFA formed pairings of teams from the same association, including those playing in the Europa League group stage (one pairing for associations with two or three teams, two pairings for associations with four or five teams), based on television audiences, where one team was drawn into Groups A–D and another team was drawn into Groups E–H, so that the two teams would have different kick-off times. The following pairings were announced by UEFA after the group stage teams were confirmed (the second team in a pairing marked by UEL played in the Europa League group stage):

 A  Slavia Prague and Slovácko
 B  Gent and Anderlecht
 C  Partizan and Red Star Belgrade (UEL)
 D  Dnipro-1 and Dynamo Kyiv (UEL)
 E  İstanbul Başakşehir and Sivasspor
 F  CFR Cluj and FCSB
 G  Basel and Zürich (UEL)
 H  Djurgårdens IF and Malmö FF (UEL)
 I  Silkeborg and Midtjylland (UEL)
 J  Molde and Bodø/Glimt (UEL)
 K  Nice and Nantes (UEL)
 L  Austria Wien and Sturm Graz (UEL)

Teams
Below were the participating teams (with their 2022 UEFA club coefficients), grouped by their seeding pot. They included:
22 winners of the play-off round (5 from Champions Path, 17 from Main Path)
10 losers of the Europa League play-off round

Notes

Format
In each group, teams played against each other home-and-away in a round-robin format. The winners of each group advanced to the round of 16, while the runners-up advanced to the knockout round play-offs. The third-placed and fourth-placed teams were eliminated from European competitions for the season.

Tiebreakers
Teams were ranked according to points (3 points for a win, 1 point for a draw, 0 points for a loss). If two or more teams were tied on points, the following tiebreaking criteria was applied, in the order given, to determine the rankings (see Article 16 Equality of points – group stage, Regulations of the UEFA Europa Conference League):
Points in head-to-head matches among the tied teams;
Goal difference in head-to-head matches among the tied teams;
Goals scored in head-to-head matches among the tied teams;
If more than two teams were tied, and after applying all head-to-head criteria above, a subset of teams were still tied, all head-to-head criteria above were reapplied exclusively to this subset of teams;
Goal difference in all group matches;
Goals scored in all group matches;
Away goals scored in all group matches;
Wins in all group matches;
Away wins in all group matches;
Disciplinary points (direct red card = 3 points; double yellow card = 3 points; single yellow card = 1 point);
UEFA club coefficient.
Due to the abolition of the away goals rule, head-to-head away goals were no longer applied as a tiebreaker starting from last season. However, total away goals were still applied as a tiebreaker.

Groups
The fixtures were announced on 27 August 2022, the day after the draw. The matches were played on 8 September, 15 September, 6 October, 13 October, 27 October and 3 November 2022. The scheduled kick-off times were 16:30, 18:45 and 21:00 CET/CEST.

Times are CET/CEST, as listed by UEFA (local times, if different, are in parentheses).

Group A

Group B

Group C

Group D

Group E

Group F

Group G

Group H

Notes

References

External links

2
UEFA Europa Conference League group stages
UEFA Europa Conference League
UEFA Europa Conference League
UEFA Europa Conference League